Taivalkoski is a municipality of Finland, it is located in the Province of Oulu and is part of the Northern Ostrobothnia region.

The municipality has a population of 
which 
is water. The population density is
.

The municipality is unilingually Finnish. The neighbouring municipalities are Kuusamo, Posio, Pudasjärvi and Suomussalmi. 
The Iijoki river runs through the centre of the village.

Taivalkoski was the home of famous writer Kalle Päätalo and television comedian Pekka Jalava. In addition, the famed Esperantist Osmo Buller, world champion ski jumper Tapio Räisänen, baseball player John Michaelson, and ice hockey player Joni Pitkänen were born in Taivalkoski.

The oldest still-operating shop of Finland, Jalavan Kauppa, is located in Taivalkoski; a shop was founded in 1883 by White Karelian-based Stephan Jakowleff, which is owned by the his descendants of the Jalava family.

International relations

Twin towns — Sister cities
 Illuka Parish, Estonia

References

External links

Municipality of Taivalkoski – Official website
VisitTaivalkoski – Official travel website

 
Populated places established in 1879